Brooke Elizabeth Lierman (born February 14, 1979) is an American civil rights attorney and politician who is the 34th Comptroller of Maryland. She was first elected in 2022, becoming the first female Comptroller of the state and the first woman elected to an independent state government office in Maryland. She was previously a Democratic member of the Maryland House of Delegates, representing District 46 in Baltimore.

Life and career
Lierman was born in Washington, D.C. on February 14, 1979, and graduated from Walt Whitman High School in Bethesda, Maryland, in 1997. She attended Dartmouth College, where she earned an A.B. degree in history in 2001. She later attended the University of Texas School of Law, where she earned a J.D. degree and graduated cum laude in 2008. Between college and law schools, Lierman was an AmeriCorps VISTA member at The DREAM Program in Vermont, working with children living in public housing developments.

Lierman is a counsel for the Baltimore civil rights firm Brown, Goldstein, & Levy LLP, where she handles a variety of civil rights and disability rights cases. She is also a trustee of the Baltimore Museum of Art and on the board of Advocates for Children and Youth and the Downtown Partnership of Baltimore.

Political career

Lierman first got involved in politics by working on the 2002 campaign of U.S. Senator Paul Wellstone, and on the presidential campaign of Howard Dean and John Kerry. Prior to going to law school, Lierman worked at the Center for American Progress in Washington, D.C. While at law school, Lierman was President of the American Constitution Society and worked as a policy advisor to Texas state senator Rodney Ellis. Lierman clerked for Judge Benson Everett Legg and Judge Deborah K. Chasanow, both Chief Judges of the federal District Court of Maryland, from 2009 to 2010.

In July 2013, Lierman announced her candidacy for the Maryland House of Delegates in District 46. She won the Democratic primary, receiving 28.1 percent of the vote and filling the seat left by retiring Delegate Brian K. McHale.

In 2016, Lierman filed to run as a Delegate to the Democratic National Convention, representing Hillary Clinton. She received 14.5 percent of the vote in the Democratic primary election, coming in third in a field of nine candidates.

In the legislature

Lierman was sworn in as a member of the House of Delegates on January 14, 2015.

Shortly after the election of President Donald Trump in November 2016, Lierman organized Baltimore Women United, a coalition of female volunteers and activists. During the 2020 United States presidential election, Lierman co-founded and co-chaired the Maryland Women for Biden organization.

In August 2018, Lierman organized a protest against the opening of a campaign office for Larry Hogan in Baltimore City, highlighting his opposition of the Red Line and handling of the State Center station redevelopment project.

Committee assignments
 Member, Environment and Transportation Committee, 2019–2023 (chair, land use & ethics subcommittee, 2019–2023; member, environment subcommittee, 2020; motor vehicle & transportation subcommittee, 2021–2023)
 Member, Joint Committee on the Chesapeake and Atlantic Coastal Bays Critical Area, 2015–2023
 Member, Joint Committee on Ending Homelessness, 2015–2023; Joint Committee on Administrative, Executive and Legislative Review, 2019–2023
 Member, Study Group on Economic Stability, 2019–2023
 House Chair, Special Joint Committee on Pensions, 2021 (member, 2015–2023)
 Member, Member, Appropriations Committee, 2015–2019 (vice-chair, transportation & the environment subcommittee, 2019, member, 2015–2019; vice-chair, oversight committee on pensions, 2019, member, 2015–2019; member, capital budget subcommittee, 2019)

Other memberships
 Member, Women Legislators of Maryland, 2015–2023
 Maryland Legislative Latino Caucus, 2015–2023
 Co-Chair, Maryland Legislative Transit Caucus, 2019–2023

Comptroller of Maryland

Elections
2022

In August 2020, Maryland Matters reported that Lierman had been aggressively contacting party activists and influencers about a potential run for Comptroller. On December 17, 2020, Lierman announced her candidacy for Comptroller of Maryland in the 2022 election, which is being vacated by Peter Franchot, who ran for governor of Maryland. She has received endorsements from various elected officials across the state, including U.S. Representatives Jamie Raskin and Steny Hoyer, President of the Maryland Senate Bill Ferguson, Speaker of the Maryland House of Delegates Adrienne A. Jones, Prince George's County Executive Angela Alsobrooks, and former U.S. Senator Barbara Mikulski.

Lierman defeated Bowie mayor Tim Adams in the Democratic primary election on July 19, 2022, receiving 66.2 percent of the vote in the Democratic primary, winning with the highest margin of victory of the highly contested statewide Democratic primaries. She defeated Harford County executive Barry Glassman in the general election on November 8, 2022, becoming the first woman to serve as Maryland comptroller and the first woman elected by voters to an independent state government office in Maryland.

Tenure

Lierman was sworn in on January 16, 2023.

Political positions

Abortion
In January 2019, Lierman was one of nine Maryland lawmakers to add their names to a manifesto signed by 326 state legislators to reaffirm their commitment to protecting abortion rights.

In March 2022, Lierman spoke in support of legislation that would enshrine the right to abortion in the Maryland State Constitution, recounting being raped while in college and worrying over the thought of what she might do if she became pregnant as a result.

Education
Lierman supports increasing funding for Baltimore City schools and universal pre-K.

Lierman introduced legislation in the 2017 legislative session that would ban pre-K suspensions and expulsions. The bill passed and became law on May 27, 2017.

During the 2019 legislative session, Lierman voted in favor of a bill that would give school districts the right to decide when classes begin and end each year. The bill passed but was vetoed by Governor Hogan. Lierman voted in favor of overriding the gubernatorial veto.

Elections
Lierman introduced legislation in the 2019 legislative session that would allow ranked choice voting in city elections, as well as open primaries. She later withdrew the bill after talking with her colleagues in the Baltimore House Delegation.

Environment
In September 2017, Lierman was one of 10 lawmakers to receive a score of 100 percent on the Maryland League of Conservation Voters' annual legislative scorecard. She received the same score in the organization's 2019 scorecard.

Lierman introduced legislation in the 2019 legislative session that would ban all polystyrene products in Maryland. The bill passed and became law without Governor Hogan's signature on May 28, 2019. The bill was slated to go into effect in July 2020, but its deadline was extended to October amid the COVID-19 pandemic.

Lierman introduced "The Plastics and Packaging Reduction Act", a bill that would ban the sale of plastic bags and require stores to charge a minimum of 10 cents for paper bags, during the 2020 legislative session. The bill passed the House of Delegates by a vote of 95-37, but was placed on hold amid the COVID-19 pandemic. The bill was reintroduced in the 2021 legislative session.

Lierman introduced legislation during the 2022 legislative session that would require the Maryland State Retirement and Pensions System to consider climate change as a financial factor when making investment decisions.

Labor
Lierman introduced legislation in the 2019 legislative session that would allow student athletes at public universities to engage in collective bargaining.

Lierman introduced legislation in the 2021 legislative session that would give college athletes the right to profit off their names and likenesses.

In February 2022, Lierman attended a rally encouraging Maryland legislators to pass a bill that would offer paid family leave to all Marylanders. She voted in favor of the Time to Care Act, which provides up to 24 weeks of paid leave per year.

Marijuana
Lierman supports the legalization of recreational marijuana and says that regulation of the industry should fall under the Alcohol and Tobacco Commission.

Social issues
Lierman introduced legislation in the 2018 legislative session that would make it illegal for police officers to have sex with people in custody. The bill passed and became law.

Lierman cosponsored legislation introduced during the 2020 legislative session that would research providing reparations to the descendants of enslaved Africans.

Lierman introduced legislation during the 2022 legislative session that would require strip clubs and bars on The Block in downtown Baltimore to close by 10 P.M. The legislation was protested by businesses owners, who said that the bill would cripple their livelihoods. The bill was modified to require business owners to record and share videos of activity on The Block, deploy off-duty police officers at peak hours, and incorporate security plans on February 18, 2022, after the group of legislators behind the bill reached a compromise with the owners of clubs on The Block.

Amid the Russian invasion of Ukraine, Lierman introduced legislation that would divest Maryland's retirement and pensions systems from Russia.

Transportation
Lierman supports the Baltimore Red Line and organized a protest against the opening of Larry Hogan's campaign office in Baltimore in 2018 over his position on the Red Line and State Center redevelopment project.

Lierman introduced legislation in the 2019 legislative session that would give counties the ability to prohibit the construction of toll roads, highways, or bridges without the consent of a majority of the affected counties. She reintroduced this legislation in 2020. Lierman also introduced a bill that would boost funding for statewide bicycle infrastructure. The bill passed but was vetoed by Governor Hogan on May 24, 2019.

Lierman introduced legislation in the 2020 legislative session that would increase funding for bus and subway maintenance. The bill passed the Maryland House of Delegates by a vote of 95-36.

Lierman introduced legislation in the 2021 legislative session that would increase funding for the state's bus and rail budget by $757 million. The bill passed but was vetoed by Governor Hogan on May 28, 2021. The Maryland General Assembly voted to override the gubernatorial veto during its special legislative session in December 2021.

Personal life
Lierman is married to Eben Hansel, a real estate attorney who she had met while they were both students at Dartmouth College. The couple married on September 19, 2010. Together, they have two children and live in Fell's Point, Baltimore.

Electoral history

References

External links

 Government website
 Campaign website

 

|-

1979 births
21st-century American politicians
21st-century American women politicians
Comptrollers of Maryland
Dartmouth College alumni
Living people
Democratic Party members of the Maryland House of Delegates
Politicians from Baltimore
Politicians from Washington, D.C.
University of Texas School of Law alumni
Women state legislators in Maryland
Walt Whitman High School (Maryland) alumni